Plesioglymmius is a genus of wrinkled bark beetles in the family Carabidae. Specimens of this genus are rare.

These species are members of Plesioglymmius:

 Plesioglymmius compactus R.T. Bell & J.R. Bell, 1979
 Plesioglymmius elegans (Grouvelle, 1903)
 Plesioglymmius jugatus R.T. Bell & J.R. Bell, 1979
 Plesioglymmius meridionalis (Grouvelle, 1903)
 Plesioglymmius moorei R.T. Bell & J.R. Bell, 1987
 Plesioglymmius negara R.T. Bell & J.R. Bell, 2000
 Plesioglymmius reichardti R.T. Bell & J.R. Bell, 1979
 Plesioglymmius silus R.T. Bell & J.R. Bell, 1979
 Plesioglymmius zayasi R.T. Bell & J.R. Bell, 2009

References

Rhysodinae
Carabidae genera